Ruy Mauro Marini (1932–1997) was a Brazilian economist and sociologist. Marini is internationally known as one of the creators of dependency theory. He is the author of the work "Dialéctica de la Dependencia" (Dialectic of Dependency), in which, using elements of the theory of economic development of Karl Marx adapted to the study of Latin American reality, he explains the necessity of overcoming the developmentalism of ECLAC. He was an activist of the Revolutionary Left Movement of Chile, becoming a member of the Central Community in 1972 and director of his theoretical journal Marxismo y Revolución.

Personal life 
Born in Barbacena, Minas Gerais, he arrived in the city of Río de Janeiro to study preparatory courses for medicine; however, he preferred personal independence, so he chose to dedicate himself to public service. In 1953, he began studying law at the Faculty of National Jurisprudence, but he did not manage to complete his student at the Federal University of Rio de Janeiro. He began studying Public Administration at the Brazilian School of Public and Business Administration and graduated in 1957. During this period, he participated intensely in the student movement, becoming editor of the student newspaper. He founded Política Operária (POLOP) with Moniz Bandeira and Theotônio dos Santos, a left-wing political organization against the guidelines of the Brazilian Communist Party.

He died from cancer in 1997 in Río de Janeiro at the age of 65.

Bibliography

References 

1932 births
1997 deaths
Brazilian economists
Brazilian sociologists
People from Barbacena
Brazilian Marxists
Federal University of Rio de Janeiro alumni